Scrub python refers to snakes of the Simalia genus, especially including:
 Amethystine python (Simalia amethistina)
 Australian scrub python (Simalia kinghorni)

According to the IUCN, the term may also sometimes be used for the following related species:
 Simalia tracyae
 Simalia clastolepis

Animal common name disambiguation pages